Rainbow Dickerson is an American actress. She is most noted for her performance as Lily in the 2020 film Beans, for which she won the Vancouver Film Critics Circle award for Best Supporting Actress in a Canadian Film at the Vancouver Film Critics Circle Awards 2020.

Of Thai and Rappahannock descent, she was named one of four Rising Stars at the 2020 Toronto International Film Festival.

Career 
In 2009, Dickerson starred in Florida Studio Theatre's production of José Rivera's Boleros for the Disenchanted. In 2019, she played Bianca in A.R.T.'s production of Othello.

Filmography

Film

Television

References

External links

Rainbow Dickerson at Backstage

21st-century American actresses
American film actresses
American television actresses
American people of Thai descent
Rappahannock people
Native American actresses
Living people
Year of birth missing (living people)